Captured by a Voice (Swedish: Fångad av en röst) is a 1943 Swedish comedy film directed by Ivar Johansson and starring Rut Holm, Åke Grönberg and Bengt Logardt. The film's sets were designed by the art director Bertil Duroj.

Cast
 Rut Holm as Concordia Blomkvist
 Åke Grönberg as 	Nicke Blom
 Marianne Inger as 	Britt Linde
 Bengt Logardt as 	Dick Grabe
 Nils Lundell as 	Peter Torberg
 Artur Rolén as Flodell
 Carl Hagman as 	Jansson
 Gerd Mårtensson as 	Karin Hall
 Sten Lindgren as 	Justus Larsson
 Linnéa Hillberg as Mrs. Grabe
 Anna-Lisa Baude as Mrs. Möller
 Henrik Schildt as 	Nils Ferlin
 Georg Skarstedt as Lindgren 
 Gunnel Wadner as 	Maid

References

Bibliography 
 Qvist, Per Olov & von Bagh, Peter. Guide to the Cinema of Sweden and Finland. Greenwood Publishing Group, 2000.

External links 
 

1943 films
Swedish comedy films
1943 comedy films
1940s Swedish-language films
Films directed by Ivar Johansson
Swedish black-and-white films
1940s Swedish films